São Paulo Futebol Clube, commonly referred to as São Paulo, is a professional football club in the Morumbi district of São Paulo, Brazil, founded in 1930. It plays in the Campeonato Paulista (the State of São Paulo's premier state league) and Campeonato Brasileiro (the top tier of the Brazilian football league system). It is one of just three clubs to have never been relegated from the Série A, alongside Flamengo and Santos.

São Paulo is one of the most successful teams in Brazil with 22 state titles, 6 Brasileirão titles, 3 Copa Libertadores titles, 1 Copa Sudamericana, 1 Supercopa Libertadores, 1 Copa CONMEBOL, 1 Copa Masters CONMEBOL, 2 Recopa Sudamericanas, 2 Intercontinental Cup and 1 FIFA Club World Cup.

São Paulo was an inaugural member of the Clube dos 13, group of Brazil's leading football clubs. The club's most consistent spell of success came in the 1990s under coach Telê Santana when it won 2 state titles, one national championship, 2 Copa Libertadores, 2 Recopa Sudamericanas, 2 Intercontinental Cups, 1 Supercopa Sudamericana, 1 Copa CONMEBOL and 1 Copa Masters CONMEBOL.

Its youth system revealed many players known worldwide, including Kaká, the last Brazilian to win the Ballon d'Or.

São Paulo is the third best-supported club in Brazil, with over 12 million supporters. The team's traditional home kit is a white shirt with two horizontal stripes (one red and one black), white shorts, and white socks. Its home ground is the 72,039-seater Morumbi football stadium in São Paulo, where it has played since 1960. The stadium was the venue for the Copa Libertadores finals of 1974, 1992, 1993, 1994, 2000, 2003, 2005 and 2006.

History

1930–1934: Origins: "São Paulo da Floresta" ("São Paulo of the Forest")

São Paulo FC was founded on 25 January 1930 by 60 former officials, players, members, and friends of the football clubs Club Athletico Paulistano and Associação Atlética das Palmeiras of São Paulo. Club Athletico Paulistano, founded in 1900 and one of the oldest clubs in town and 11-time champions of São Paulo, abandoned football due to the professionalization of the sport. Associação Atlética das Palmeiras, founded in 1902 and three-time champions of São Paulo, intended after the end of the season 1929 to set up a professional team, but failed to do so.

The jerseys of the new club were derived from Associação Atlética das Palmeiras, which were white and sported a black ring across the chest. To the black-and-white of Associação Atlética das Palmeiras was added the red-and-white of Club Athletico Paulistano, and the ring became red, white, and black.

Club Athletico Paulistano brought to the union star players Arthur Friedenreich and Araken Patusca. Associação Atlética das Palmeiras' contribution was the stadium Estádio da Floresta, generally known as Chácara da Floresta.

Internal arguments and turmoil led to financial problems. The club merged with Clube de Regatas Tietê, another sports club from the town, and the football department was disbanded on 14 May 1935.

1935–1939: The rebirth of São Paulo FC
Just after the merger with Tietê, the founders and re-founders created the Grêmio Tricolor, which formed Clube Atlético São Paulo on 4 June 1935, and, finally, São Paulo Futebol Clube on 16 December of the same year.

The new club's first game was against Portuguesa Santista on 25 January 1936. The match was almost cancelled, owing to the city's anniversary, but Porphyrio da Paz, the football director and composer of the club's anthem, obtained permission from the Board of Education Office for the game to continue.

Another merger occurred in 1938, this time with Clube Atlético Estudantes Paulista, from the neighborhood of Moóca, and the club finished as runners-up in the Campeonato Paulista.

1940–1950: "The Steam Roller"
In 1940, when the Estádio do Pacaembu was inaugurated, a new era began in São Paulo state football. São Paulo Futebol Clube finished as runners-up once again in the Campeonato Paulista in 1941, and a year later the club paid 200 and a year later the club paid 200 contos de réis (equivalent to approximately R$162,000 today) to acquire Leônidas from Flamengo. During this period, São Paulo also acquired the Argentinian António Sastre and Brazilians Noronha, José Carlos Bauer, Zezé Procópio, Luizinho, Rui and Teixeirinha. With these new additions, Tricolor became known as the Steam Roller, winning the Paulista championship five times, in 1943, 1945, 1946, 1948 and 1949. The club sold its Canindé training ground to Portuguesa to raise money for their new stadium, the Estádio do Morumbi, for which construction began in 1952.

1951–1957: The dry spell
The run of success of the 1940s, came to an end in the early 1950s, and the club only won two state championships in the new decade, in 1953 and 1957. The 1957 championship was won with the help of the 35-year-old Brazilian international Zizinho, and Hungarian manager Béla Guttmann, both of them becoming idols. Guttmann took charge of the team in 1957 and won the São Paulo State Championship that year. While in Brazil he helped popularise the 4–2–4 formation, which was subsequently used by Brazil as they won the 1958 FIFA World Cup.

In the years that followed, the club struggled to compete with the rise of Pelé and his club, Santos. With the construction of the Morumbi stadium still ongoing, São Paulo entered its longest period without a title in its history, which was to last 13 years.

1958–1969: Just the stadium
Since São Paulo's budget planning was focused on the Estádio do Morumbi construction rather than the signing of new players, few expensive players were bought during the 1960s, although the club did acquire Brazilian internationals Roberto Dias and Jurandir. In 1960, the Estádio do Morumbi was inaugurated, named after the late Cícero Pompeu de Toledo, the club's chairman during most of the stadium construction. One of the few happy moments for the fans during this period was the 1963 Paulista Championship 4–1 victory against Pelé's Santos.

1970–1979: Campeonato Brasileiro (Brazilian Championship)
In 1970, the Estádio do Morumbi was finally completed and the club purchased Gérson from Botafogo, Uruguayan midfielder Pedro Rocha from Peñarol and striker Toninho Guerreiro from Santos. The club was managed by Zezé Moreira, who was the manager of Brazil at the World Cup in 1954, and won the Paulista Championship after beating Guarani 2–1 in the Campinas a week before the end of the competition.

In 1971, the club beat Palmeiras 1–0 with a goal from Toninho Guerreiro in the final to capture another state title. That year saw the inaugural Campeonato Brasileiro, with the club finishing as runners-up to Atlético Mineiro, managed by Telê Santana.

In the following years, São Paulo and Palmeiras gradually overtook Pelé's Santos and Corinthians as the dominant club sides in São Paulo state. In 1972, Palmeiras won the state championship title, only one point ahead of São Paulo, and the following year the clubs finished in the same positions in the Brazilian Championship. In 1974, São Paulo took part in the Copa Libertadores losing in the final to Independiente in a replay.

In 1975, former goalkeeper José Poy took over as manager, and São Paulo won the Paulista Championship after defeating Portuguesa in a penalty shoot-out.

Valdir Peres, Chicão, Serginho Chulapa and Zé Sérgio were the club's most influential players when São Paulo finally secured the Brazilian Championship for the first time in 1977 following a penalty shoot-out victory over Atlético Mineiro at the Mineirão. However, they failed to win another trophy until the reclaimed the Paulista Championship in 1980.

The 1980s: Tricolor decade
In the 1980s, São Paulo won four Paulista and one Brazilian titles, helped by the impressive central defensive pair of Oscar and Dario Pereyra. 1980 and 1981, the club won the Paulista Championship in successive seasons for the first time since the 1940s.

In 1985, the head coach Cilinho introduced to the world the Menudos of Morumbi, a team that included Paulo Silas, Müller and Sidney, and the club once again won the Paulista Championship. The main striker was Careca, a centre-forward who also played for Brazil in the 1986 FIFA World Cup. The midfield featured Falcão, brought in from Italian club Roma and becoming a big part in winning the Campeonato Paulista in 1985.
In 1986, manager Pepe led the club to its second Brazilian Championship title, defeating Guarani in a penalty shoot-out. In 1987, Dario Pereyra left the club, but in that year the Menudos team won its last title, another Paulista title. The so-called Tricolor Decade ended with the 1989 Paulista Championship title and a second-place finish in the Brazilian Championship, when São Paulo lost to Vasco da Gama in the final match.

1990–1995: The Telê Santana Era, CONMEBOL and Intercontinental cups

In 1990, after a poor start to the campaign in Championship Paulista, Telê Santana was hired as the club's coach, and São Paulo went on to finish runners-up in the Brazilian Championship. In 1991, Santana won his first title after winning the Paulista championship.

In 1991, São Paulo won the Brazilian championship after beating Carlos Alberto Parreira's Bragantino, and the club began a period of consistent achievement both nationally and internationally. The following year they reached the Copa Libertadores final, where they faced Newell's Old Boys of Argentina. São Paulo lost the first leg 1–0, but reversed the scoreline in the second leg in Brazil, and then won the competition in the penalty shoot-out to take the title for the first time.

In the same year, in Tokyo the club won its first Intercontinental Cup, beating Johan Cruyff's Barcelona 2–1. After returning to Brazil, the club beat Palmeiras 2–1 to win its 18th state championship title.

In 1993, São Paulo retained the Copa Libertadores, beating Universidad Católica of Chile in the finals 5–3 on aggregate, including a 5–1 first leg win. After the competition, influential midfielder Raí left the club. The Copa Libertadores win allowed the club to play the Recopa Sudamericana that year, beating 1992 Supercopa Libertadores winners and fellow Brazilian side Cruzeiro. The club also won the 1993 Supercopa Libertadores, beating Flamengo on penalties in the final. The Supercopa Libertadores title meant the club has completed an unprecedented CONMEBOL treble (Copa Libertadores, Recopa Sudamericana, Supercopa Libertadores).

São Paulo was able to defend its Intercontinental Cup title again, beating Fabio Capello's Milan 3–2. Müller scored the winning goal in the 86th minute of the match, from an assist by Toninho Cerezo. This meant the club had completed a quadruple.

In 1994, the club reached the Copa Libertadores finals for the third year in a row, and faced Argentina's Vélez Sársfield. On this occasion they lost on penalties to the Argentine side at the Morumbi stadium. But by the end of this year, São Paulo won the Copa CONMEBOL, defeating Peñarol of Uruguay in the final.

1996–2004: Post-Telê years

At the beginning of 1996, owing to health issues, Telê Santana left São Paulo, ending the club's golden era. Between 1995 and 2004, the club had fourteen managers. Among the most notable titles during those ten years were the 2000 Paulista Championship and the club's first Rio-São Paulo Tournament title in 2001. Rogério Ceni, Júlio Baptista, Luís Fabiano and Kaká were the club's stars. Raí briefly returned to the club between 1998 and 2000, and with him, the club won the Paulista Championship twice, in 1998 and 2000, after beating Corinthians and Santos, respectively. In 2004 São Paulo were back in the Copa Libertadores and reached the semi-finals before being eliminated by underdogs Once Caldas from Colombia. At the end of that year, Émerson Leão was hired as the club's coach.

In 2003, São Paulo made a deal with Spanish amateur side Santangelo Club Aficionado that resulted in the Spanish club changing its name to São Paulo Madrid.

2005–2009: Three Brazilian Championships, Libertadores and FIFA Club World Cup
In 2005, with Leão as the club's manager, São Paulo won the Paulista Championship. Leão, however, would soon leave the club with Paulo Autuori, former manager of the Peru national team, hired to replace him. São Paulo won the Libertadores Cup for the third time, beating another Brazilian side, Atlético Paranaense, in the final. Atlético switched the first leg of the final to Estádio Beira-Rio, Porto Alegre, their own ground not having sufficient capacity for a final, and the match ended in a 1–1 draw. In the second leg, at the Morumbi, São Paulo won 4–0 to become the first Brazilian club to win three Copa Libertadores titles.

In December 2005, São Paulo competed in the FIFA Club World Championship in Japan. After beating Saudi Arabia's Al-Ittihad 3–2, they faced European champions Liverpool in the final. A 1–0 victory over the English team gave São Paulo its third intercontinental title. The single goal was scored by Mineiro in the first half of the match. Other players in that year's squad included centre-back Diego Lugano, full-back Cicinho, forward Amoroso, and the record-breaking goalkeeper Rogério Ceni, who was selected Man of the Match at the FIFA Club World Championship title match, as well as the tournament's MVP.

After the success of the 2005 season, Paulo Autuori left the team to coach Kashima Antlers in the J. League. Muricy Ramalho was signed up as the new coach, having led Internacional to the runners-up position in the 2005 Brazilian Championship. In his first tournament as a manager, Ramalho reached second place in the Paulista Championship, losing to Santos by one point. São Paulo reached the final of the 2006 Copa Libertadores, but lost 4–3 on aggregate to Brazilian rivals Internacional. However, they went on to win their fourth Campeonato Brasileiro trophy, becoming the first team to become national champions in the new league system format.

After being eliminated from the Copa Libertadores round of 16 to Grêmio in 2007, São Paulo won the Brazilian title for the second year in a row, fifteen points ahead of second-placed Santos. They won the title for the third season running in 2008 season, overturning an 11-point deficit behind Grêmio in the second half, to win its sixth league title. Manager Muricy Ramalho was the first manager to win three league titles in a row with the same team.

Despite this feat, Muricy was sacked the following year after São Paulo was eliminated in the 2009 Copa Libertadores quarter-finals to Cruzeiro, its fourth consecutive elimination to a Brazilian side. Ricardo Gomes took over as manager. The club was very close to winning the league for the fourth time in a row, however, after struggling in the final 4 games, they ended up finishing in third.

2010–2020: Copa Sudamericana and a tough period
In 2010 São Paulo lost once again to Internacional in the 2010 Copa Libertadores, this time in the semifinals, ending Ricardo Gomes' spell as manager. The club finished ninth in the league, not qualifying for the international competition for the first time since 2003.

In 2011, the club signed Rivaldo and brought back Luís Fabiano for a club-record €7.6 million from Sevilla. Goalkeeper Rogério Ceni, meanwhile, scored his 100th career goal, against Corinthians in the Campeonato Paulista. Despite these events, it was another very disappointing season, finishing sixth in the league and failing to qualify for the Libertadores once again.

In research conducted by Brazilian sports website GloboEsporte.com, São Paulo, during the eight years between 2003 and 2011, were just the second Brazilian club to earn more money than losses in the transfer market – Tricolor paulista received R$287 million, behind only Internacional, which earned R$289 million.

In 2012, São Paulo won the Copa Sudamericana (its only title in the 2010 decade) and qualified for next season's Libertadores, finishing fourth in the league under Ney Franco. However, after that season, the club hit a second massive dry spell and struggled to regain its dominance in the Brazilian and South American stage.

For the 2013 season, after seven years wearing kits produced by Reebok, São Paulo signed with Brazilian brand Penalty. The contract was valid until 2015 and the club earned R$35 million per year. This contract was the second-most lucrative kit deal in Brazil, just exceeded by Flamengo and Adidas' deal of R$38 million. In May 2015 São Paulo presented its new kits, made by Under Armour. In 2018 the team became sponsored by Adidas.

In 2014, 2018 and 2020 the club was one of the contenders for the national league title, but did not win it; São Paulo finished runners-up in 2014, fifth in 2018, and fourth in 2020, the last two being marked by massives drops of form in the second half. In contrast to this, they struggled hard in 2013 and 2017, fighting (and eventually saving themselves) against relegation to the second tier.

Continentally, in 2016 the club reached the semi-finals of the Copa Libertadores, losing to Atlético Nacional.

In the entire 2010 decade, São Paulo didn't win a single Campeonato Paulista title for the first time since 1960s.

2021–present

In 2021, São Paulo finally ended its second biggest dry spell in its history (8 years); under new manager Hernán Crespo, the club defeated Palmeiras at the Campeonato Paulista finals, winning the competition for the first time since 2005. However, after a continuing sequence of poor results, Crespo was sacked five months later, with the club involved in another relegation battle at the Campeonato Brasileiro, being replaced by the club legend Rogério Ceni.

Under manager Rogério Ceni the club was runner-up at the 2022 Campeonato Paulista, reaching the third state finals in four years; a progress for the club, since São Paulo didn't reach the state finals between 2007 and 2018. The club reached the semifinals of the 2022 Copa do Brasil, being eliminated by Flamengo. São Paulo was runner-up at the 2022 Copa Sudamericana, losing to C.S.D. Independiente del Valle from Ecuador in Córdoba, Argentina.

Colours and badge
When Club Athletico Paulistano and Associação Atlética das Palmeiras merged, their colours (red and white for CA Paulistano and black and white for AA das Palmeiras) were inherited by São Paulo. The colours match those of São Paulo's state flag, and also represents the three main races that lived in Brazil during that period: the Native Brazilians (represented by the red), the White Brazilians (represented by the white) and the Afro-Brazilians (represented by the black).

The club's home kit is a white shirt, with two horizontal stripes at chest level, the upper one red and the lower one black, and the badge in the centre of the chest; the shorts and socks are white. The away kit consists of a shirt with red, white and black vertical stripes, black shorts and black socks.

The badge, representing a heart with five points, consists of a shield with a black rectangle in the upper section bearing the initials SPFC in white; below the rectangle there's a red, white and black triangle. It was designed by the german graphic designer Walter Ostrich and one of the founders, Firmiano de Morais Pinto Filho. The badge also has five stars, two gold and three red ones: the gold ones denote Adhemar Ferreira da Silva's World and Olympic records at the 1952 Summer Olympics in Helsinki and at the 1955 Pan American Games in Mexico City; the red ones represent each of the two Intercontinental Cups and the FIFA Club World Cup won by the club.

Kit suppliers and shirt sponsors

Stadium

São Paulo's stadium is officially named Estádio Cícero Pompeu de Toledo (Cicero Pompeu de Toledo Stadium) and commonly known by the nickname Estádio do Morumbi (Morumbi Stadium). The first game played at the stadium was on 2 October 1960, when Milan win 1–0 in a friendly match against Sporting Club from Portugal. It was inaugurated in with a maximum sitting capacity of 120,000 people, but now its maximum capacity is 72,039 seats.

The club also owns two training grounds, one named Centro de Treinamento Frederico Antônio Germano Menzen (Frederico Antônio Germano Menzen Training Center), nicknamed Centro de Treinamento (CT) da Barra Funda (Barra Funda's Training Center), which is used mostly by the professional team. The other is the Centro de Formação de Atletas Presidente Laudo Natel (President Laudo Natel Athletes Formation Center), nicknamed Centro de Treinamento (CT) de Cotia (Cotia's Training Center), which is used by the youth teams.

Players

First-team squad

Youth players with first team numbers

Other players under contract

Out on loan

Retired numbers 
 01 –  Rogério Ceni, Goalkeeper (1990–2015)

Greatest Players 
The most famous and beloved players that have played for the club since its foundation in 1930.

Legend:

In bold, SPFC stars that have already passed away.

"*" Greatest São Paulo Futebol Clube player

Personnel

Current technical staff

Club rivalries

São Paulo vs. Palmeiras

This fixture is nicknamed the "Choque Rei", and has seen 114 wins by São Paulo, 113 wins by Palmeiras and 110 draws.

São Paulo vs. Santos

Also known as "San-São", this fixture was first played in 1936. Since then, São Paulo have won it 137 times, Santos 106, and there have been 75 draws.

São Paulo vs. Corinthians

The game between these clubs is also known as "Majestoso", a name coined by Thomas Mazzoni. The first "Majestoso" occurred on 25 May 1930. The fixture has seen 109 wins for São Paulo, 131 wins for Corinthians and 113 draws.

Honours 

São Paulo FC is one of the most successful clubs in Brazil, having won a total of 30 domestic honours, in addition to their 12 international successes. It is the brazilian club with the most international titles.

Major competitions

Other competitions 
 Taça dos Campeões Estaduais Rio – São Paulo (11): 1931, 1943, 1945, 1946, 1948, 1954, 1958, 1975, 1980, 1985, 1987
 Torneio Inicio Paulista (3): 1932, 1940, 1945
 Campeonato Paulista de Aspirantes (18): 1933 (APEA), 1938, 1940, 1942, 1943, 1944, 1945, 1946, 1947, 1953, 1954, 1955, 1958 (Extra), 1960, 1962, 1976, 1993, 1995
 Torneio dos Cinco Clubes (1): 1934
 Taça Cidade de São Paulo (1): 1944
 Torneio Prefeito Lineu Prestes (1): 1950
 Taça Armando Arruda Pereira (1): 1952
 Small Club World Cup (2): 1955, 1963
 Torneio Roberto Gomes Pedrosa (1): 1956
 Taça Charles Miller (1): 1956
Trofeo Colombino (1): 1969
Torneio Nunes Freire (1): 1976 
Ciutat de Barcelona Trophy (2): 1991, 1992
Ramón de Carranza Trophy (1): 1992
Teresa Herrera Trophy (1): 1992
Trofeo Bortolotti (1): 1995
Torneio Rei Dadá (1): 1995
Copa dos Campeões Mundiais (2): 1995, 1996 
Euro-America Cup (1): 1999
Constantino Cury Tournament (1): 2000
Eusébio Cup (1): 2013
 Florida Cup (1): 2017

Runners-Up 
Copa Libertadores (3): 1974, 1994, 2006
Supercopa Libertadores (1): 1997
Copa Sudamericana (1): 2022
Recopa Sudamericana (2): 2006, 2013
Copa de Oro (2): 1995, 1996
Suruga Bank Cup (1): 2013
Campeonato Brasileiro (6): 1971, 1973, 1981, 1989, 1990, 2014
Copa do Brasil (1): 2000
Copa dos Campeões da Copa Brasil (1): 1978
Copa dos Campeões (1): 2001
Torneio Rio – São Paulo (5): 1933, 1962, 1966, 1998, 2002
Campeonato Paulista de Futebol (25): 1930, 1932, 1933, 1934, 1938, 1941, 1944, 1950, 1952, 1956, 1958, 1962, 1963, 1967, 1972, 1978, 1982, 1983, 1994, 1996, 1997, 2003, 2006, 2019, 2022

Campeonato Brasileiro Série A record 

Torneio Roberto Gomes Pedrosa

Campeonato Brasileiro

Campeonato Paulista record

References

External links

  
Article that explains the difference between the dates of 1930 and 1935 

 
Football clubs in São Paulo (state)
Association football clubs established in 1930
Unrelegated association football clubs
FIFA Club World Cup winning clubs
1930 establishments in Brazil
Copa Libertadores winning clubs
Copa Sudamericana winning clubs
Copa CONMEBOL winning clubs
Recopa Sudamericana winning clubs
Intercontinental Cup winning clubs
Campeonato Brasileiro Série A winning clubs